The Don Burnett Bicycle-Pedestrian Bridge, renamed from Mary Avenue Bridge on July 19, 2011, is a cable-stayed bridge over Interstate 280 (California), spanning Cupertino, California and Sunnyvale, California, used for bicycle and pedestrian traffic. It is the only cable-stayed pedestrian bridge over a highway in California. At night the bridge is lit up and can be seen by those driving on or crossing Interstate 280.  The project was awarded a Helen Putnam Award of Excellence. It also won the California Transportation Foundation's Pedestrian/Bicycle Project of the Year.

Construction
The bridge was completed in 2008 and it cost $14.8 million. Roughly 80 percent of the funding for the bridge came from grants, bonds and the Santa Clara Valley Transportation Authority. The original plan for the bridge was to use concrete to keep costs down, but a steel design was chosen after the bids for a concrete bridge came in too high.

Location details
North of I-280, Mary Avenue ends in a parking lot and drop-off area for Homestead High School. Mary Avenue continues south of the highway and ends at De Anza College's north entrance.

The address for the southern entrance to the bridge is 10655 Mary Ave, Cupertino, CA 95014-1355. The address for the northern entrance to the bridge is 21370 Homestead Rd, Cupertino, CA 95014.

See also 
 Bicycle bridge

References

External links

Mary Ave. Bike Footbridge Webcam

Cupertino, California
Bridges in the San Francisco Bay Area
Cable-stayed bridges in the United States
Bridges completed in 2008
Transportation buildings and structures in Santa Clara County, California
Pedestrian bridges in California
Steel bridges in the United States